Tropidophis maculatus, or the spotted red dwarf boa, is a species of snake in the family Tropidophiidae. The species is endemic to Cuba.

References

Tropidophiidae
Reptiles described in 1840
Snakes of the Caribbean
Reptiles of Cuba
Endemic fauna of Cuba